Parliamentary elections were held in Iceland on 11 June 1967. The Independence Party remained the largest party in the Lower House of the Althing, winning 15 of the 40 seats.

Results

References

Iceland
Parliament
Elections in Iceland
Parliamentary elections in Iceland
Iceland